Eugénie Le Sommer is a French professional footballer who has represented the France women's national football team as a forward since her debut in 2009. With 86 goals, she is the all-time top scorer of her country.

Le Sommer made her international debut on 12 February 2009 in a 2–0 friendly win over Republic of Ireland. Since then, she has appeared in 175 matches for France. On 22 September 2020, she scored her 82nd international goal and surpassed Marinette Pichon to become all-time top scorer of France.

International goals
Scores and results list France's goal tally first, score column indicates score after each Le Sommer goal.

Statistics

See also
 List of top international women's football goal scorers by country
 List of women's footballers with 100 or more international goals

References

Le Sommer
Women's association football records and statistics
Le Sommer goals
Association football in France lists